Mushroom Soup: The Citadel Years is an anthology album from The Stems, released in 2003 through Citadel Records.  It is a collection of all the band's singles, songs from their debut EP, Love Will Grow - Rosebud Volume 1, previously unreleased demos and alternative song versions and a video for "Tears Me In Two".

Tracks 1 & 4, 9–12, 14-18 were recorded at Shelter Studios, Perth by John Gailbraith, with Tracks 2 & 3, 5-8 recorded at Trafalgar Studios, Sydney produced by Rob Younger and engineered by Alan Thorne. Track 13 was recorded at Sound West Studios, Perth with John Gailbraith, mixed at Trafalgar Studios by Rob Younger and Alan Thorne, and Tracks 4,11 & 12 were re-mixed at Revolver Studios by Ben Glatzer and Dom Mariani.

Track listing

 "Make You Mine" (Dom Mariani) 4:45 
 "Tears Me in Two" (R Lane/J Matthews) 3:22 
 "Just Ain't Enough" (D Mariani) 2:46 
 "No Heart" (D Mariani) 3:18 
 "Jumping to Conclusions" (D Mariani) 4:14 
 "Can't Resist" (D Mariani) 2:35 
 "Love Will Grow" (D Mariani) 3:15 
 "Under Your Mushroom" (R Lane/J Matthews) 2:38 
 "On and On" (D Mariani) 4:13 
 "She's a Monster" (D Mariani) 3:49 
 "Don't Let Me" (R Lane/D Mariani) 2:20 
 "All You Want Me For" ( J Matthews)2:18 
 "Power of Love" (D Mariani) 4:13 
 "For Always" (D Mariani) 2:46 
 "Mr. Misery" (D Mariani) 3:23 
 "She's Fine" (D Mariani) 2:36 
 "Tears Me in Two" (R Lane/J Matthews) 3:08 
 "Lon Chaney Junior's Daughter" (R Lane/D Mariani) 2:46 
 "Tears Me in Two (R Lane/J Matthews) (Video Clip)

References 

Compilation albums by Australian artists
The Stems albums
2003 compilation albums